Felice...Felice... is a 1998 Dutch drama film directed by Peter Delpeut and was based o the photographs of Felice Beato. The film won the Golden Calves for Best Feature Film and Best Actor (Johan Leysen).

Plot
At the end of the 19th century, a photographer returns to Japan to find out his wife has vanished.

Cast
Johan Leysen... 	Felice Beato
Toshie Ogura	... 	Ume
Rina Yasami	... 	O-Take
Noriko Sasaki	... 	Hana
Yoshi Oïda	... 	Matsukichi
Keiko Miyamoto	... 	Innkeeper
Yoshi Ota	... 	Ueno
Noriko Proett	... 	O-Koma
Rika Okemoto	... 	O-Tae
Megumi Shimanuki	... 	Kimiyo
Kumi Nakamura	... 	O-Kiku
Kyomi Yui	... 	Model
Peter Kho Sin Kie	... 	Man in rain
Daichi Taneko	... 	Playing boy
Machiko Okemoto	... 	Playing boy

External links

References 

1998 films
1990s Dutch-language films
1998 drama films
Dutch drama films